Rashk (also Romanized as Rāshk; also known as Rājg-e Sarney, Rāshg-e Sarney, and Rāshk-e Sarney) is a village in Tukahur Rural District, Tukahur District, Minab County, Hormozgan Province, Iran. At the 2006 census, its population was 75, in 20 families.

References 

Populated places in Minab County